Strictly in the Groove is a 1942 American musical comedy film directed by Vernon Keays. It is built around musical numbers, experienced comedy acts and guest stars.

Plot
A jive-talking college student tries to organize a swing-music show at a local resort, where the manager puts up some opposition.

Cast 

 Leon Errol as Durham
 Shemp Howard as Pops
 Franklin Pangborn as Cathcart
 Grace McDonald as Dixie
 Mary Healy as Sally Monroe
 Richard Davies as Bob Saunders
 Russell Hicks as R.C. Saunders
 Eddie Johnson as Skat
 Charles Lang as Russ Monroe
 Ralph Dunn as Big Boy
 Holmes Herbert as Commissioner
 Lloyd Ingraham as McClelland
 Tim Ryan as Professor Blake
 unbilled players include Spade Cooley and Neely Edwards

Musical guests 

 Ozzie Nelson and his Orchestra 
 Martha Tilton
 Jimmie Davis 
 The Dinning Sisters 
 Diamond Solid-Aires 
 Jimmy Wakely and his Trio

External links 

 

1942 films
Universal Pictures films
1942 musical comedy films
American musical comedy films
Films directed by Vernon Keays
American black-and-white films
1940s American films